Virginia Samaras Bauer is an advocate for families of the victims of the September 11 terror attacks and a government leader in New Jersey.  She currently is CFO of a security technology company that develops and markets proprietary software. She serves as Director of the Newmark Group, Inc. which is a publicly traded company operating a full service commercial real estate service business that offers a full time suite of services and products for owners and occupiers across the entire commercial real estate industry. Since 2008 she has served and continues to serve as a Member of Executive Committee on the National 9/11 Memorial and Museum. Appointed in 2020 by Governor Phil Murphy, she serves as a Director to the New Jersey Economic Development Authority.

Virginia's former positions include Senior Vice President of Covenant House International (2009 - 2010), Executive Director of the New Jersey Lottery (2003 - 2004) and Financial Advisor at Merrill Lynch (1978 - 1985). She served as a Commissioner of the Port Authority of New York and New Jersey (2008 - 2012).  She is a former New Jersey Secretary of Commerce, Economic Growth and Tourism. She also served as a Cabinet Member to New Jersey Governor's McGreevy, Codey, and Corzine (2004 - 2008).

Her first husband, W. David Bauer, was a bond trader for Cantor Fitzgerald and was killed in the collapse of the World Trade Center on September 11, 2001.  Bauer, a mother of three to David, Stephen and Jackie, became an advocate for 9/11 families, working to secure tax relief and other benefits from the federal government.  Her advocacy work brought her into contact with New Jersey political leaders.  A graduate of Rosemont College in Rosemont, Pennsylvania, Bauer is the daughter of Peter J. and Virginia K. Samaras. Bauer remarried in October 2007; her husband is Donald A. Steckroth (b. 1947), a widower and a judge in the United States Bankruptcy Court. Raised in Middletown Township, New Jersey and Little Silver, she attended Red Bank Catholic High School. Bauer lived in Rumson, New Jersey before moving to Red Bank.

A former analyst for Merrill Lynch, Bauer was appointed New Jersey Lottery Director in 2003 by former Gov. James McGreevey.  In the summer of 2004, McGreevey appointed her as Chief Executive Officer and Secretary of the New Jersey Commerce, Economic Growth and Tourism Commission, a position she retained in the cabinet of former Gov. Richard Codey.  On January 16, 2006, Governor of New Jersey Jon Corzine announced his intention to retain Bauer in his cabinet.  In March 2007, Corzine announced his nomination of Bauer to serve as a Commissioner of the Port Authority of New York and New Jersey, a part-time position running the bi-state transportation agency, which owns the World Trade Center site.  She is the first 9/11 widow from New Jersey to be appointed to the Port Authority Board.

After being appointed to the Port Authority Board, Bauer announced that she was stepping down as Commerce Secretary as part of a planned restructuring of state economic development agencies by Corzine.  After leaving Commerce, it was announced that she was becoming head of government relations for a major real estate developer in New Jersey. There has been speculation in the media that Corzine was considering Bauer as a running mate for lieutenant governor in the 2009 election.  However, earlier in the year she moved into a new position with Covenant House as Senior Vice President, Development. As mentioned above, Virginia moved on to multiple high-power positions within the private sector and serves on multiple boards (Newmark Group, Inc, Foundation Board of the Monmouth Medical Center, and Trustee of The Peddie School) while maintaining her position as Director of New Jersey's Economic Development Authority.

References

External links
Port Authority of NY & NJ - Board of Commissioners

State cabinet secretaries of New Jersey
Living people
People from Little Silver, New Jersey
People from Middletown Township, New Jersey
People from Red Bank, New Jersey
People from Rumson, New Jersey
Red Bank Catholic High School alumni
Rosemont College alumni
Women in New Jersey politics
1956 births
21st-century American women